Rümikon AG railway station is a railway station in the Swiss canton of Aargau and municipality of Rümikon. The station is located on the Winterthur to Koblenz line of Swiss Federal Railways.

Services
 the following services stop at Rümikon AG:

References

External links
 
 

Railway stations in the canton of Aargau
Swiss Federal Railways stations